The Awhea River is a river of New Zealand.

See also
List of rivers of New Zealand

References
Land Information New Zealand - Search for Place Names

Rivers of the Wellington Region
Rivers of New Zealand